Iveta Pole (born January 11, 1981) is a Latvian theatre and film actress, born in Liepāja.

She is affiliated with Jaunais Rīgas teātris (New Riga Theatre) led by Alvis Hermanis and has played parts in theatre shows Latvian Stories (2004, director Alvis Hermanis), Ice (2006, director Alvis Hermanis), Sound of Silence (2007, director Alvis Hermanis) and Look Back In Anger (2008, director Varis Pinkis).

References
https://web.archive.org/web/20110722162638/http://www.jrt.lv/personas.php?id=13&lomas=1

1981 births
Living people
Latvian film actresses
Latvian stage actresses
Lielais Kristaps Award winners
Actors from Liepāja
21st-century Latvian actresses